Nur Zahirah Macwilson binti Zainol Macwilson (born 1 February 1995) is a Malaysian actress and model. She is of British and Malay descent.

Personal life
In December 2018, she was reported to be in relationship with singer and actor Aiman Hakim Ridza while both were acting in Curi-Curi Cinta, and confirmed their relationship. Zahirah  and Aiman became engaged on 8 June 2019 in Perth, Australia.They tied the knot on 20 February 2020.

On 8 January 2021, Zahirah and Aiman posted on their Instagram account that they had welcomed a baby boy on 5 January 2021 at 2.26pm in Perth, Australia.

On 5 March 2021, Zahirah and Aiman revealed their son's name, Isaac Raees, for the first time on their Instagram account.

Filmography

Film

Television series

Television movie

References

External links
 
 
 

Living people
1995 births
Malaysian film actresses
Malaysian television actresses
Malaysian female models
People from Kuala Lumpur
Curtin University alumni
21st-century Malaysian actresses
Malaysian people of Australian descent
Malaysian people of English descent
Malaysian people of Malay descent
Malaysian Muslims